Jason Kyle Perry (born August 18, 1980) is an American former Major League Baseball outfielder who played for the Atlanta Braves in 2008.

Amateur career
A native of Fremont, Nebraska, Perry attended Georgia Tech, and in 2001 he played collegiate summer baseball with the Hyannis Mets of the Cape Cod Baseball League, where he was named a league all-star. He was selected by the Toronto Blue Jays in the 6th round of the 2002 MLB Draft.

Professional career

Toronto Blue Jays
Perry played for the Blue Jays organization until June 23, 2003, when he was traded to the Oakland Athletics for John-Ford Griffin.

Oakland Athletics
For the next five years, Perry would play in the Athletics minor leagues. In , he was named to the Texas League's All-star team as the DH. On June 14, 2007, Perry was traded to the Detroit Tigers for Jack Hannahan.

Detroit Tigers
In 16 games for the Tigers' Triple-A affiliate, the Toledo Mud Hens, Perry struggled with a .184 batting average, but did hit two home runs. The Tigers released him during  spring training.

Atlanta Braves
Signed by his hometown Braves (Perry was born in Nebraska, but grew up in nearby Jonesboro, Georgia), Perry was promoted to the major league club from Triple-A Richmond on July 4, 2008, to replace struggling outfielder Jeff Francoeur, who was optioned to Double-A Mississippi. Before his promotion, Perry had hit .309 with 18 homers between Mississippi and Richmond in 2008. The move reunited him with former Georgia Tech teammate Mark Teixeira. Perry made his major league debut that night against the Houston Astros, starting in Francoeur's usual right field spot. In his first MLB at bat, Perry hit an RBI triple off Astros starter Brian Moehler. The hit made him the first player in Atlanta history to triple in his first at-bat.

Tampa Bay Rays
On May 6, Perry was signed by the Tampa Bay Rays to a minor league contract and was assigned to Double-A Montgomery.

References

External links

1980 births
Living people
Baseball players from Nebraska
People from Fremont, Nebraska
Major League Baseball outfielders
Georgia Tech Yellow Jackets baseball players
Hyannis Harbor Hawks players
Sacramento River Cats players
Toledo Mud Hens players
Mississippi Braves players
Richmond Braves players
Atlanta Braves players
Lancaster Barnstormers players
Azucareros del Este players
American expatriate baseball players in the Dominican Republic
Dunedin Blue Jays players
Gulf Coast Rays players
Leones del Escogido players
Medicine Hat Blue Jays players
American expatriate baseball players in Canada
Midland RockHounds players
Modesto A's players
Montgomery Biscuits players
Phoenix Desert Dogs players